Keçiborlu is a town and district of Isparta Province in the Mediterranean region of Turkey. The town had 7,049 inhabitants according to 2010 census.

Etymology
The town was known as Eudoxipolis (Ευδοξίπολη in Greek) during the Roman and early Byzantine periods. By the 12th century it was known as Sublaeum.

History

Keçiborlu is known as the site where Atlasjet Flight 4203 crashed on November 30, 2007.

Economy

In the early 20th-century, sulphur was mined in the area.

References

External links 
 District governor's official website 

Populated places in Isparta Province
Districts of Isparta Province
Towns in Turkey